The 2011–12 KHL season was the fourth season of the Kontinental Hockey League.  The regular season began with the Opening Cup game on 7 September 2011, but because of the 2011 Lokomotiv Yaroslavl plane crash, which occurred during the first period of the Cup game and killed all but one member of the Lokomotiv Yaroslavl team, further play was delayed until 12 September 2011. The tragedy forced Lokomotiv Yaroslavl to cancel their participation in the KHL season. The Opening Cup was renamed the Lokomotiv Cup in honor of those lost in the tragedy.
The regular season ended on 26 February 2012 and the following playoffs ended on 25 April.

The Gagarin Cup was won by Dynamo Moscow, defeating Avangard Omsk in a seven-game final series. Dynamo Moscow is the first champion from the Western Conference of the KHL.

League changes

Team changes
Expansion to Slovakia

With the admission of Lev Poprad from Poprad, Slovakia the league expanded beyond the borders of the former Soviet Union. This brought the number of teams to 24. However, following the Lokomotiv Yaroslavl plane crash that claimed the lives of the entire Lokomotiv Yaroslavl squad (with the exceptions of forward Maxim Zyuzyakin and goaltending coach Jorma Valtonen), Lokomotiv withdrew from the season, leaving only 23 teams as in the previous season.

Regular season

The regular season was supposed to start on 7 September 2011 with the Opening Cup and end on 26 February 2012 with short breaks in November, December and February for international matches and for the all-star game. However, after the Yaroslavl plane tragedy, the schedule had to be modified: the start of the season was postponed to 12 September and the number of games for each team was reduced to 54 as in the previous season, when also only 23 teams participated.

Notable events

Yaroslavl plane tragedy

On  7 September 2011, the day of the season opening, a tragic airplane accident occurred in Yaroslavl in which the Lokomotiv Yaroslavl team was killed. After the news broke in Ufa, where the Opening Cup game between Salavat Yulaev Ufa and Atlant Moscow Oblast was already underway, the match was abandoned. Later, the KHL announced that the start of the season would be postponed to 12 September, and that pre-game ceremonies would be held to honour the Lokomotiv team, while arena entertainment would be cancelled. On 10 September, at Lokomotiv's public memorial service team president Yuri Yakovlev announced that they would not participate in the 2011–12 KHL season.

All-star game

The All-star weekend took place on 20–21 January 2012 in Riga, Latvia. Team Fedorov defeated Team Ozoliņš with 15–11.

League standings

Source: KHL.ru

Points are awarded as follows:
3 Points for a win in regulation ("W")
2 Points for a win in overtime ("OTW") or a penalty shootout ("SOW")
1 Point for a loss in overtime ("OTL") or a penalty shootout ("SOL")
0 Points for a loss in regulation ("L")

The conference standings determined the seedings for the play-offs. The first two places in each conference are reserved for the division winners.

Note: Bolded teams qualified for the playoffs.

Western Conference

y – Won division; z – Won conference (and division); 
BOB - Bobrov Division, TAR - Tarasov Division

Source: khl.ru

Eastern Conference

y – Won division; c – Won Continental Cup  (best record in KHL);
CHE - Chernyshev Division, KHA - Kharlamov Division

Source: khl.ru

Player statistics

Scoring leaders
Updated as of the end of the regular season. Source: khl.ru

  
GP = Games played; G = Goals; A = Assists; Pts = Points; +/– = Plus-minus; PIM = Penalty minutes

Leading goaltenders
Updated as of the end of the regular season. Source: khl.ru

GP = Games played; Min = Minutes played; W = Wins; L = Losses; SOL = Shootout losses; GA = Goals against; SO = Shutouts; SV% = Save percentage; GAA = Goals against average

Playoffs

The playoffs started on 29 February 2012  with the top eight teams from both conferences and ended on 25 April with the seventh game of the Gagarin Cup final.

Player statistics

Playoff scoring leaders
The following players lead the league in points at the conclusion of the playoffs. Source: khl.ru

  
GP = Games played; G = Goals; A = Assists; Pts = Points; +/– = Plus-minus; PIM = Penalty minutes

Playoff leading goaltenders
The following players lead the league in points at the conclusion of the playoffs. Source: khl.ru

GP = Games played; Min = Minutes played; W = Wins; L = Losses; SOL = Shootout losses; GA = Goals against; SO = Shutouts; SV% = Save percentage; GAA = Goals against average

Final standings

Awards

Players of the Month

Best KHL players of each month.

KHL Awards
On 23 May 2012, the KHL held their annual award ceremony. A total of 20 different awards were handed out to teams, players, officials and media. The most important trophies are listed in the table below.

The league also awarded six "Golden Helmets" for the members of the all-star team:

References

External links
Official Website

 
Kontinental Hockey League seasons
1
1